Peter Cameron (1847 – 1 December 1912 in New Mills, Derbyshire) was an English amateur entomologist who specialised in Hymenoptera.

An artist Cameron worked in the dye industry and in calico printing. He described many new species; his collection, including type material,  is now in the Natural History Museum. He suffered from poor health and lack of employment. Latterly, he lived in New Mills and was supported by scholarships from the Royal Society.

He loaned specimens to Jean-Jacques Kieffer, a teacher and Catholic priest in Bitche, Lorraine, who also named species after Cameron.

Works

A Monograph of the British Phytophagous Hymenoptera Ray Society (1882–1893)  
Hymenoptera volumes of the Biologia Centrali-Americana, volumes 1-2 (1883–1900) and (1888–1900)
See External Links for complete list.

References

External links
Publications of Peter Cameron
Manuscript collection
BHL Hymenoptera Orientalis: or contributions to a knowledge of the Hymenoptera of the Oriental zoological region. Manchester :Literary and Philosophical Society,1889-1903.
Digital Version of Biologia Centrali-Americana

English entomologists
Hymenopterists
1847 births
1912 deaths
People from New Mills